The Torre River is a small river in the south west Algarve, Portugal. The rivers headwater sources are a number of small streams and brooks rising from springs across the Serra de Monchique.

References 

Torre
Torre